A Morton's fork is a type of false dilemma in which contradictory observations lead to the same conclusion. It is said to have originated with the rationalising of a benevolence by the 15th century English prelate John Morton.

The earliest known use of the term dates from the mid-19th century and the only known earlier mention is a claim by Francis Bacon of an extant tradition.

Dilemma
Under Henry VII, John Morton was made archbishop of Canterbury in 1486 and Lord Chancellor in 1487. He rationalised requiring the payment of a benevolence (tax) to King Henry by reasoning that someone living modestly must be saving money, and therefore could afford the benevolence, whereas someone living extravagantly was obviously rich, and therefore could also afford the benevolence. Morton's Fork may have been invented by another of Henry's supporters, Richard Foxe.

Other uses
"Morton's fork coup" is a manoeuvre in the game of bridge that uses the principle of Morton's fork.

See also
 Hobson's choice
 Sophie's Choice

References

Dilemmas
Logic
Decision-making paradoxes